Argentina competed at the 1980 Winter Olympics in Lake Placid, United States.

Alpine skiing

Men

Biathlon

Men

Men's 4 x 7.5 km relay

 1 A penalty loop of 150 metres had to be skied per missed target.
 2 One minute added per close miss (a hit in the outer ring), two minutes added per complete miss.

Cross-country skiing

Men

References
Official Olympic Reports
 Olympic Winter Games 1980, full results by sports-reference.com

Nations at the 1980 Winter Olympics
1980
1980 in Argentine sport